Sir Charters James Symonds  (1852–1932) was a British-Canadian surgeon, and surgeon to Guy's Hospital, London.

Charters Symonds was born at Dalhousie, New Brunswick, Canada on 24 July 1852, the son of Charles Symonds, a barrister, who died in California in 1860.

In 1889 he married Fanny Marie Shaw (d 1930), daughter of Lieutenant-General David Shaw, of the Madras Army, and they had two sons, the elder being Sir Charles Symonds physician to Guy's Hospital.

Symonds died on 4 September 1932 in Harrow, London, England, and was buried in Christ Church, Roxeth, Harrow.

References

1852 births
1932 deaths
British surgeons
Canadian surgeons
People from Restigouche County, New Brunswick
Charters Symonds family